Gromiida is an order of cercozoans. It is the only order in the class Gromiidea.

Taxonomy
Class Gromiidea Cavalier-Smith 2003 sensu Bass et al. 2009
 Order Gromiida Claparède & Lachmann 1856 s.s.
 Family Gromiidae Ruess 1862 [Gromiina Delage & Herouard 1896; Gromioidea Reuss 1862]
 Genus Gromia Dujardin 1835 [Hyalopus Schaudinn 1894]

References 

 
Endomyxa
Cercozoa orders
Parasitic rhizaria